The Canadian Organization for Rare Disorders (CORD) is a Canadian registered charity that is a network of organizations who represent people affected by rare diseases. CORD's purpose is to provide a strong common voice advocating for a healthcare system and health policy for those with rare disorders.

Overview
CORD represents the orphan disorders community in the development of Canadian Orphan Drug Policy, including the proposed Expensive Drugs for Rare Disorders program within the National Pharmaceutical Strategy CORD is working to promote state-of-the-art Newborn Screening in all provinces and territories. CORD is working to ensure Canada's Clinical Trials Registry works effectively for those with rare disorders. CORD is committed to increasing access to genetic screening and genetic counseling for all rare disorders. Currently, Durhane Wong-Rieger is the President of CORD.

Their national offices are located in Toronto, Ontario, with an Alberta chapter located in Edmonton, Alberta.

See also
Rare diseases
National Organization for Rare Disorders American based organization
European Organization for Rare Diseases
Rare Disease Day

References

External links
Official Website
CORD Fan Page on Facebook

Health charities in Canada
Medical and health organizations based in Ontario
Patients' organizations
Rare diseases